Nina Gerhard (born 10 December 1974), also known as Nina, is a German singer best known as the voice of Captain Hollywood Project and for her 1994 hit "The Reason Is You".

Career 
Nina performed vocals on the Captain Hollywood Project single "More and More", which was a #1 hit in Germany and a top 20 hit on the Billboard Hot 100. Also the follow up single "Only with You". She later recorded the solo single "The Reason Is You", which was a #2 hit in the Belgian singles chart. Her follow-up single, "Until All Your Dreams Come True", peaked at #17.

References

External links 
 Personal website (in German)

Gerhard, Nina
Gerhard, Nina